Daphne Diana Joan Susanna Guinness (born 9 November 1967) is an English designer, actress, producer, and musician.

Early life
Her father is Jonathan Guinness, 3rd Baron Moyne, the eldest son of Diana Mitford and Bryan Guinness. Diana Mitford was the daughter of David Freeman-Mitford, 2nd Baron Redesdale, the father of the Mitford sisters. Mitford divorced Guinness and married the leader of the British Union of Fascists, Sir Oswald Mosley, 6th Baronet of Ancoats. Daphne Guinness has said she did not know of Mosley's political affiliations, before she heard in 1980 on the BBC News that he had died.

As a child, Guinness grew up moving between the country houses owned by her family in England and Ireland, and a villa in Spain, where Salvador Dalí was a family friend. She later lived in New York with her half-sister, Catherine Guinness, who was working as a Personal Assistant to Andy Warhol.

Fashion

Guinness's first work in fashion was with Isabella Blow. She has worked with Karl Lagerfeld, NARS, MAC, Akris, Gareth Pugh, and Philip Treacy, working with them artistically or as a model or both. She was a friend of the late fashion designer Alexander McQueen. 

She designs clothes, jewelry, and perfume. Since 1994, she has been on the International Best Dressed List. In 2011, she created a make-up line for MAC cosmetics.

In 2011, Guinness was featured on the cover of Zoo Magazine.

Film

Producer
Guinness has produced and edited three short films:

 Cashback, a short film nominated for an Academy Award in 2004, was later made into a feature-length version. Guinness produced this film for the photographer Sean Ellis.

Acting
In 2011, Guinness starred in Joe Lally's film, The Murder of Jean Seberg.

At the end of 2011, photographers Markus Klinko and Indrani, Guinness, and stylist GK Reid produced The Legend of Lady White Snake, a film based on a Chinese legend, where Guinness played the central role of Lady White Snake. Bernard-Henri Lévy wrote her dialogue for the film.

In 2012, Guinness starred in Shakki, a short sci-fi fiction directed by Julien Landais.

Music
David Bowie encouraged Guinness to pursue music, introducing her to Tony Visconti, who had produced three of her albums as of August 2020.

Optimist in Black (2016)
After the deaths of her brother Jasper and friends Isabella Blow and Alexander McQueen, Guinness went to a studio in Ireland, intending to record a cover of Bob Dylan's "Desolation Row". While there, she wrote and recorded original songs which became the basis for her first album, Optimist in Black. Optimist in Black was released on 27 May 2016, through private label Agent Anonyme/Absolute.
 The album was described by Kim Taylor Bennett of Vice magazine as "drama-pop with a gothic tinge" and by Matthew Schneier of The New York Times as having "a glam-rock-ish, slightly psychedelic flavor".

Daphne & The Golden Chord (2018)
In April 2018, Guinness released her second album, Daphne & The Golden Chord, also produced by Visconti. The album was recorded on analog tapes at British Grove Studios in a three-week session. The band included 58 instrumentalists including timpani, tambourine, and bassoon players. Will Hodgkinson of The Times described the album as "aristocratic glam fuelled by wit, character and a clear and abiding love of rock'n'roll".

Revelations (2020)
Guinness' third album, Revelations, was released in August 2020. Like her prior two albums, it was produced by Visconti. 
Thomas Barrie of British GQ said Revelations features "lusher, disco-inflected instrumentation, with flourishes arranged by Visconti in strings, and parts written for more experimental, obscure instruments like the theremin and ocarina". Guinness collaborated with David LaChapelle on a three-part film series also titled Revelations, which featured songs from the album and explored references to the Book of Revelation.

Music videos
Guinness' music career began with the release in 2013 and 2014 of several music videos for songs which would later be included in her first album. These early videos include "Fatal Flaw" (directed by Nick Knight) in 2013, and "Evening in Space", directed by LaChapelle, in 2014. Jessie Peterson of MTV News said the video took the "fashion world to space". It featured costumes from designers such as Iris van Herpen and Noritaka Tatehana.

Guinness also released music video versions for two songs that were on the 2018 Daphne & The Golden Chord album – "Talking to Yourself" and "Remember to Breathe".

Two music videos directed by LaChapelle were released in 2020 for "Hallucinations" and "Heaven", two of the songs on the Revelations album.

Charity work
Guinness has walked in two of Naomi Campbell's Fashion for Relief shows to raise funds for disaster victims. In April 2008, she auctioned off part of her wardrobe, with the proceeds going to a British charity called Womankind Worldwide, which deals with issues such as domestic violence.

In June 2010, Guinness purchased at auction the entire wardrobe of Isabella Blow, her friend who died by suicide in 2007. The lot was purchased prior to an auction, which was arranged at Christie's. She later announced that she would be displaying the wardrobe at Central Saint Martins and online, as well as starting a foundation to help with mental illness. The official show, entitled "Isabella Blow: Fashion Galore," was displayed in November 2013 at Somerset House in London.

In February 2013, Guinness, along with Baroness Monica von Neumann and Lynn Ban, donated a collection of her shoes to the Museum at Fashion Institute of Technology's Shoe Obsession exhibit.

Personal life
In 1987, she married Spyros Niarchos, the second son of Stavros Niarchos. The couple had three children. Her $39 million settlement, obtained at the time of her 1999 divorce, was added to her Guinness inheritance.

She lives in London and Manhattan with her three children: Nicolas Stavros Niarchos (born 1989), Alexis "Lex" Spyros Niarchos (born 1991), and Ines Sophia Niarchos (born 1995).

She has been romantically involved with French philosopher Bernard-Henri Lévy for a number of years. In the February 2011 issue of Harper's Bazaar, Guinness confirmed to journalist Derek Blasberg: "He is obviously the love of my life".

References

External links
 

 Insights about Optimist in Black - Video

1967 births
Living people
English fashion designers
English socialites
People from Hampstead
Daphne
Daughters of barons
Niarchos family
British women fashion designers